Elections to Bury Metropolitan Borough Council were held on 2 May 2002. One-third of the council was up for election and the Labour Party kept overall control of the council.

After the election, the composition of the council was
Labour 32
Conservative 13
Liberal Democrat 3

Election result

Ward results

References

2002 English local elections
2002
2000s in Greater Manchester